Da Qaidam is an administrative committee in Haixi Prefecture in northwestern Qinghai province, China. It borders Gansu province to the north.

Name

The Mandarin pinyin romanization of the Chinese transcription of Qaidam is "Cháidàn".

Geography and climate
Da Qaidam borders Delingha to the east, Lenghu to the west, Golmud across the Qarhan Playa to the south, and Jiuquan (Gansu) to the north, and is part of the northern Qaidam Basin.

Similar to neighbouring Golmud, Da Qaidam has an arid climate (Köppen BWk), with long, cold winters, and warm summers, although due to its location further north and elevation more than  higher than Golmud, its climate is also subalpine in nature. With monthly percent possible sunshine ranging from 65% in July to 82% in October, the area receives 3,257 hours of bright sunshine annually.

Economy
As elsewhere in the Qaidam Basin, mining industries are of major importance in Da Qaidam. There is a lead mine in Xitieshan, the Xitieshan Lead Mine  as well as a number of salt lakes where potash and related products are extracted.

Transportation
China National Highway 215 and China National Highway 315 pass through  and meet here. Yinmaxia railway station and Xitieshan railway station on the Qinghai–Tibet Railway are both located within

References

External links 
Official government website

County-level divisions of Qinghai
Haixi Mongol and Tibetan Autonomous Prefecture